Sundae (sometimes anglicized as soondae) is a type of blood sausage in Korean cuisine. It is a popular street food in both North and South Korea, generally made by steaming cow or pig's intestines stuffed with various ingredients.

History 
The sundae sausage dates back to the Goryeo period (918–1392), when wild boars, prominent across the Korean Peninsula, were used in the dish. Recipes for sundae are found in nineteenth century cookbooks including Gyuhap chongseo and Siuijeonseo.

Traditional sundae, cow or pig intestines stuffed with seonji (blood), minced meats, rice, and vegetables, was an indulgent food consumed during special occasions, festivities and large family gatherings. After the Korean War, when meat was scarce during the period of post-war poverty, dangmyeon replaced meat fillings in South Korea. Sundae became an inexpensive street snack sold in bunsikjip (snack bars), pojangmacha (street stalls), and traditional markets.

Varieties 

Traditional South Korean varieties, as well as all North Korean, Russian Korean (Koryo-saram and Sakhalin Korean), and Chinese Korean sundae fillings include seonji (blood), minced meat, rice, and vegetables. Modern South Korean bunsik (snack food) varieties often use dangmyeon (glass noodles) instead of meat, rice, and vegetables. Other fillings include kkaennip (perilla leaves), scallions, doenjang (soybean paste), kimchi, and soybean sprouts.

Regional varieties include abai-sundae from the Hamgyong and Pyongan Provinces, Kaesong-sundae from Kaesong, Baegam-sundae from Yongin, Jeju-sundae from Jeju Island, Byeongcheon-sundae from Chungcheong Province, and amppong-sundae from Jeolla Province.

Some varieties use seafood as casing. Ojingeo-sundae, made with fresh squid, is a local specialty of Gangwon, while mareun-ojingeo-sundae made with dried squid is eaten in Gangwon as well as Gyeonggi. Myeongtae-sundae, made with Alaska pollock is a local specialty of Gangwon and Hamgyong. Eogyo-sundae is made with the swim bladder of brown croakers.

Accompaniments 
In South Korea, sundae is often steamed and served with steamed offals such as gan (liver) and heopa (lung). Sliced pieces of sundae and sides are dipped in salt-black pepper mixture (Seoul), in vinegar-gochujang mixture (Honam), seasoned soybean paste in Yeongnam, and soy sauce in Jeju. Sundae is sold a lot at guk-bap restaurants or bunsikjip(snack bars). As sundae is often sold in bunsikjip, along with tteok-bokki (stir-fried rice cakes) and twigim (fritters), it is also dipped in tteok-bokki sauce. Many bunsikjip offer tteok-twi-sun, a set menu with tteok-bokki, twigim and sundae.

Sundae dishes 
 Sundae-guk – a guk (soup) made with sundae, other offals, and meat.
 Sundae-bokkeum – a bokkeum (stir-fry) made with sundae, vegetables, and gochujang.
 Baek-sundae-bokkeum – a sundae-bokkeum without gochujang.

See also 
 Black pudding
 Gyurma
 Haggis
 Kaszanka
 Kazy
 List of sausages

References 

Blood sausages
Bunsik
Korean sausages
Street food in South Korea
Precooked sausages